The 2022 Colorado wildfire season is an ongoing series of wildfires that have been burning throughout the U.S. state of Colorado.

List of wildfires

See also 
 Colorado State Forest Service
 List of Colorado wildfires
 2022 New Mexico wildfires

References

2022 in Colorado
Wildfires in Colorado